Snoopy Presents: It's the Small Things, Charlie Brown, or simply It's the Small Things, Charlie Brown, is a Peanuts animated special. It was released on Apple TV+ on April 15, 2022. This is the first special written by Brian and Craig Schulz, who are the son and grandson of Charles M. Schulz, respectively.

Plot 
Charlie Brown is determined to win the big baseball game. But things turn into a fiasco right before the matchup, when Sally bonds with a little flower on the pitcher's mound and vows to protect it at all costs.

Cast 

 Tyler Nathan as Charlie Brown
 Terry McGurrin as Snoopy
 Hattie Kragten as Sally
 Rob Tinkler as Woodstock
 Lexi Perri as Peppermint Patty
 Isabella Leo as Lucy
 Wyatt White as Linus
 Holly Gorski as Marcie
 Caleb Bellavance as Franklin
 Natasha Nathan as Patty
 Charlie Boyle as Violet
 Jacob Soley as Pig-Pen
 Maya Misaljevic as Frieda
 Matthew Mucci as Schroeder
 Jackson Reid as Thibault
 Will Bhaneja as Shermy
 Jacob Mazeral as Jose Peterson
 Lucas Nguyen as Floyd
 Beatrice Schneider as Lydia
 Maria Nash as Eudora
 Evan Sheppard-Greenhow as 5

Production 
On October 19, 2020, Apple signed a deal to acquire the streaming rights to the Peanuts holiday specials for Apple TV+, including orders for new animated specials to be produced for the service. The release date and title for the special were revealed on February 22, 2022, with the trailer following on March 31.
 
It's the Small Things, Charlie Brown is the second Peanuts special following It's Arbor Day, Charlie Brown (1976) to address Earth Day.

References

External links

Peanuts television specials
Apple TV+ original programming
2022 films
Baseball animation